The River Wey is a main tributary of the River Thames in south east England. Its two branches, one of which rises near Alton in Hampshire and the other in West Sussex to the south of Haslemere, join at Tilford in Surrey.  Once combined the flow is eastwards then northwards via Godalming and Guildford to meet the Thames at Weybridge.  Downstream the river forms the backdrop to Newark Priory and Brooklands. The Wey and Godalming Navigations were built in the 17th and 18th centuries, to create a navigable route from Godalming to the Thames.

Although it is the longest tributary of the Thames (if the Medway is excluded), its total average discharge is lower than that of the Kennet and Cherwell. The river morphology and biodiversity of the Wey are well studied, with many places to take samples and record data. The main tributary is the Tillingbourne, which rises on the western slopes of Leith Hill and flows westwards to join the Wey to the south of Guildford, between Shalford and Peasmarsh.

The name Wey is of unknown origin and meaning.

Course

Wey North

The Wey north branch, sometimes referred to as the Alton Wey, has its official nomenclature source in Alton in Hampshire; however is exceeded by length and, in wet weather, in flow by the nearby Caker Stream rising in dendritic drainage spanning fields of Upper Farringdon and Hartley Mauditt, passing Chawton between these places. After the union in Alton the brook runs quite straight, east north-east through Upper Froyle and Bentley, turning southeast after Farnham's centre to Tilford. 

The steep-sided valley accentuates entering Surrey, between vast masses termed the Lower Greensand Group (south), then down the more easterly valley on both sides (east and west).

The upper parts of the branch were the start of the upper River Blackwater's catchment. The Wey captured this following cumulative flooding and deposition right up to around Aldershot. This transported distinctive gravels containing chert, to deposit them north of the gap in the chalky ridge at Farnham. The source rocks of the gravels prove the former extent of the river. Great erosion has occurred in the Wey down to Tilford, along the sinuous, multiple-anabranch Waverley Abbey stretch, through, what Blyth notes as, the "soft strata", of that landscape.

Wey South
The Wey South branch stems from two main westward brooks, one now followed by the Portsmouth Direct Line, the other – with longer source brooks – following the Surrey/Sussex boundary, which combine at a point, heading west, where the line first comes as close as 97 metres to the boundary – in the east end of a park, next to one of its three river footbridges. These brooks are fed by six main streams. The farthest are the southern streams. These drain parallel, north, narrow vales between the northerly "fingers" or "ribs" of:
Blackdown, the third-highest hill in Southeastern England
Ridge Hill
Fridays Hill
Marley Heights (formerly Moseshill), called Marley Common

The northern streams drain fingers of a single east–west ridge of Greensand, their common names, again from east to west, are:
Wey Down (High Lane Estate)
Inval(l)
Stoatley Rise
Brownscombe

Of varying size, these are long, sandy hills south-east of the upper tip of the Devil's Punch Bowl: Gibbet Hill, Hindhead. One of the northern streams adjoins strips of woodland named Weydown Common and Weycombe.

The south sources are specifically: a wood-surrounded neighbourhood, Kingsley Green (formerly Marsh) in Fernhurst; Chase Farm marking the furthest point south in Surrey; and upper fishponds at Wades Marsh marking the Fernhurst/Lurgashall boundary (both in West Sussex), next to the summit of Ridge Hill (which is the furthest source).

The Wey drains and passes Haslemere's western suburbs then Liphook, Bramshott (including Passfield), Standford and Lindford, and the large parish of Frensham.  It combines with the north branch at Tilford, in which parish all three flows have large meanders. 

Notable tributaries of the south branch are Cooper's Stream and the River Slea.

Combined river
From Tilford the river runs through Elstead, Eashing, Godalming, Peasmarsh/Shalford, Guildford, Send, Old Woking, Pyrford, Byfleet, New Haw and forms the historically much more meandering border between Addlestone/Weybridge, today doing so most accurately between Hamm Court and Whittet's Ait respectively. From Godalming the river is intertwined with the Wey and Godalming Navigations. The  of the navigations' towpath is open to pedestrians. The river joins the Thames at a cascading channel off its Navigation Canal (above Thames Lock) between Hamm Court and Whittet's Ait and a weir-fed navigation east of the ait facing the main weir stream of Shepperton Lock.

Tributaries
The River Ock joins at Godalming, Cranleigh Waters and the River Tillingbourne at Shalford and the Hoe Stream at Woking.

History

The river has long been used as a source of power for mills, and many are recorded in the Domesday Book. Between the 17th and 19th centuries there were over 40 mills on the river and more on its tributaries. At various times they have been used for grinding grain, fulling wool, rolling oats, crushing cattle cake, leather dressing, paper production and gunpowder manufacture. Willey Mill, at Farnham, was still in use in 1953. Headley Mill is still in commercial operation.  Guildford Town Mill, though no longer used for milling, still harnesses the power of the river to generate electricity.

During the seventeenth century, the river was made navigable to Guildford and extended in the eighteenth century to Godalming. The Basingstoke Canal and Wey and Arun Junction Canal were later connected to the river. The navigable sections are now owned by the National Trust.

Natural environment

Wey Valley is a term for the narrowing basin of the River Wey before it empties into the River Thames.

Much of the upper reaches of the river are within the Surrey Hills Area of Outstanding Natural Beauty. The river passes through a variety of habitats including heathland, woodland and watermeadow, resulting in a diversity of wildlife. There are Sites of Special Scientific Interest (SSSI) and Nature Reserves along the river.

A broad basin of aquifers drain steeply to the river so, as with the Mole, in its natural state, much of the flood plains were prone to regular flooding.  This has been greatly reduced by flood alleviation measures, upstream lakes such as Frensham Great Pond and, inadvertently, the Wey navigations. The lowest urban areas of Godalming, Byfleet and Weybridge saw extensive flooding in the exceptional winter storms of 2013–14.

Water quality
The Environment Agency measure water quality of the river systems in England. Each is given an overall ecological status, which may be one of five levels: high, good, moderate, poor and bad. There are several components that are used to determine this, including biological status, which looks at the quantity and varieties of invertebrates, angiosperms and fish. Chemical status, which compares the concentrations of various chemicals against known safe concentrations, is rated good or fail.

Water quality of the River Wey in 2019:

Further reading 
 Inland Waterways Association (South-East Region) The River Wey and Godalming Navigation: Weybridge to Godalming Inland Waterways Association 1976

See also 
Tributaries of the River Thames
Canals of the United Kingdom
List of rivers of England
Perseverance IV, last floating River Wey barge.
Mills on the River Wey and its tributaries

Notes and references
Notes 
  
References

External links 

 The River Wey Trust
 River Wey and Godalming Navigations and Dapdune Wharf
 River Wey Catchment Flood Warnings

Rivers of Hampshire
Rivers of Surrey
River navigations in the United Kingdom
Wey